Dichomeris viridella is a moth in the family Gelechiidae. It was described by Snellen in 1901. It is found on Java.

The forewings are green, but whitish at the margins and a triangular blackish-brown mark in the middle. The hindwings are uniform dark grey.

References

Moths described in 1901
viridella